ESPN Megacast, formerly known as ESPN Full Circle, is a multi-network simulcast of a single sporting event across multiple ESPN networks and serviceswith each feed providing a different version of the telecast making use of different features, functions or perspectives. These simulcasts typically involve ESPN's linear television channels and internet streaming platforms, and may occasionally incorporate other Walt Disney Television networks at once.

ESPN Full Circle debuted with ESPN Full Circle: North Carolina at Duke on March 4, 2006, on the one-year anniversary of ESPNU. The game was the North Carolina Tar Heels at the Duke Blue Devils in college basketball. Five further Full Circle broadcasts were produced (one NBA playoff game, one NASCAR race and three more college basketball games) before the format was discontinued in 2007.

After a seven-year hiatus, full-circle broadcasts resumed under the Megacast branding in 2014. To date, the feature has primarily been used for the College Football Playoff and National Championship, but has expanded to include select broadcasts from the NFL, NBA, NHL, Major League Baseball, and the PGA Tour.

College Basketball Megacasts

North Carolina at Duke 
The first Full Circle telecast covered the college basketball game between the North Carolina Tar Heels and the Duke Blue Devils, to honor the one-year anniversary of the launch of ESPN's college sports network ESPNU.

ESPN aired the game's traditional coverage (along with live "look-ins" to the other views, simulcast in 120 countries through ESPN International), ESPN2 featured an "Above the Rim" camera, and ESPNU featured a split-screen with the "Cameron Crazy Cam". ESPN360 offered additional stats, hosted by ESPN Radio's Jeff Rickard, Mobile ESPN featured game alerts, live updates and in-game polling for a replay of a classic Duke-North Carolina game, and ESPN.com featured live chats, in-game polling and highlights. The ESPN and ESPN2 broadcasts were also available in HD.

The game was seen by an average of 3.78 million households on ESPN and ESPN2 making it the most-viewed men's college basketball game ever combining the networks. There were also two million page views on ESPN.com and one million video streams across ESPN.com and ESPN 360. ESPN's single network coverage garnered a 3.5 rating, the network's highest-rated men's college basketball game in more than four years (Maryland at Duke posted a 3.5 in January 2002). ESPN2's "Above the Rim" coverage generated a 0.7 rating, 40% higher than the network's per-game season average. Brad Nessler called the game along with Dick Vitale and Erin Andrews. This game is significant since it was the last time to date that Nessler called a Saturday Primetime game.

NCAA Women's Basketball Championship 

The sixth installment of ESPN Full Circle was on April 3, 2007, in Cleveland, Ohio. The official name of the telecast was ESPN Full Circle: NCAA Women's Championship and the game was between No. 1 Tennessee Lady Volunteers and No. 4 Rutgers Scarlet Knights. It was the first women's event presented as an ESPN Full Circle telecast. Mike Patrick called the game along with Doris Burke and reporters Holly Rowe and Mark Jones. Tennessee defeated Rutgers, 59–46, winning its seventh national title.

Coverage 
 ESPN (ESPNHD) featured the traditional coverage of a regular college basketball game. It also had "look-ins" to how other entities are covering the game.
 ESPN2 (ESPN2HD) had six coverage boxes; two with isolated shots of players (mainly Matee Ajavon of Rutgers and Candace Parker of Tennessee, isolated shots of the opposing coaches (C. Vivian Stringer of Rutgers and Pat Summitt of Tennessee), another alternating statistics and replays in the lower center, and a simulcast of the traditional game coverage on ESPN. This feed had separate commentators, Doug Gottlieb and Carolyn Peck. Gottlieb and Peck were also joined by guests for interviews throughout the game; he also jokingly called the setup "The Matrix". Enhanced graphics were available for those viewing the game in high definition with full-time integrated stats pillars on each side of the screen.
 ESPNU presented the Above the Rim camera angles as well as a simulcast and statistics. This feed also had commentary from Mike Hall and Charlene Curtis.
 ESPN360 offered enhanced statistics.
 ESPN.com provided in-game fan polls and live chats with, among others, Nancy Lieberman.

Coach K’s Last Home Game 
For Mike Krzyzewski’s last home game as Duke head coach, ESPN broke out the MegaCast for Duke’s final home game of the 2021-22 regular season against North Carolina.

ESPN aired the main telecast, as part of both their Saturday Primetime and Sonic Blockbuster series, with Dan Shulman, Duke alum Jay Bilas, and Holly Rowe calling the action. In addition, a special two-hour edition of College GameDay, led by Rece Davis, Bilas, Seth Greenberg, and LaPhonso Ellis, was also broadcast live from Cameron Indoor Stadium earlier in the day. The game also aired in 4K on DirecTV, Comcast, YouTube TV, and Verizon FiOS.
ACC Network provided a second-screen alternate feed called “ Coach K Curtain Call”, which offered commentary from Wes Durham, Mark Packer, and Debbie Antonelli, as well as interviews with special guests throughout the game. ACC Network’s pregame show “Nothing But Net” also broadcast live from Cameron Indoor Stadium for a 90-minute pregame show prior to the game.

ESPN also had live, onsite reports from Duke starting Thursday, March 3. Various studio shows, halftime of men’s college games from Thursday through Saturday made their presence on campus as well. ESPN also had live on-site coverage all day that Saturday, which began with the 7 a.m. SportsCenter, leading into GameDay.

Every presentation was available on the ESPN app.

2022 Women's Final Four 
ESPN’s MegaCast series continued the weekend of April 3rd for the 2022 Women's Final Four.

 The main telecasts of all games aired on ESPN per usual, with Ryan Ruocco, Rebecca Lobo, Holly Rowe, and Andraya Carter calling the action.
 For the semifinals, ESPNU and ESPN+ simulcast The Bird and Taurasi Show, hosted by WNBA legends Sue Bird and Diana Taurasi. In a similar approach to the Manningcast, Bird and Taurasi had their own concourse set, where they provided their own commentary and were joined by special guests throughout the night. This feed moved to ESPN2 for the Championship Game.
 ESPN+ carried different feeds, including a Second Spectrum Player Tracking broadcast, which aired on ESPN+ for the semifinals, and was simulcast on ESPNU for the Championship Game. ESPN+ also carried the Beyond the Rim and On the Rail feeds.

All broadcasts were made available on the ESPN App.

NBA Megacasts

Bulls-Heat NBA Playoffs 
This was the second installment of ESPN Full Circle, which aired on April 22, 2006. The official name of this one was ESPN Full Circle: Bulls-Heat NBA Playoffs and the game was the Chicago Bulls vs. the Miami Heat. The game was seen by an average of 2,648,000 households on ESPN and ESPN2, marking a 45% increase when compared to the equivalent NBA playoff telecast the previous year. In addition, ESPN.com's ESPN Motion received nearly 600,000 video streams for Bulls/Heat content. Mike Tirico called the game along with Bill Walton and Steve "Snapper" Jones and Jim Gray as the sideline reporter.

Coverage 
 ESPN (ESPNHD) featured standard coverage of the game
 ESPN2 (ESPN2HD) featured the Above the Rim cam along with commentary from NBA Shootaround commentators John Saunders, Greg Anthony, Tim Legler and Stephen A. Smith.
 ESPN360 featured additional stats, hosted by ESPN Radio's Jeff Rickard and NBA insider John Hollinger.
 ESPN Deportes simulcast the game in Spanish with Álvaro Martín and Carlos Morales.
 ESPN.com coverage included live chats with NBA on ESPN analysts during the game, in addition to GameCast information and in-game fan polling.
 ESPN Radio provided on-site updates during ESPN Radio's GameNight.
 ESPNEWS featured in progress highlights and analysis from ESPN NBA analysts.
 Mobile ESPN provided in-progress video highlights throughout the game and halftime analysis. It also had a live scoreboard and an in-game box score.

NBA-Daily Wager 
Before, ESPN's NBA Megacasts have usually seen a streaming platform air the game in different ways. On April 14, 2021, ESPN+ teamed up with ESPN to air a Daily Wager broadcast of the Brooklyn Nets-Philadelphia 76ers game with betting stats popping up during the game, and the Daily Wager crew and Kendrick Perkins providing commentary. This was available for ESPN+ subscribers, but, this telecast was also simulcast on ESPN2 for people watching on TV and streaming via their cable providers on the ESPN app.

NBA-Marvel Arena of Heroes Competition 
For the first time ever, on May 3, 2021, Marvel Studios teamed up with ESPN on a Megacast of an NBA game, as Steph Curry and the Golden State Warriors faced Zion Williamson and the New Orleans Pelicans for a special "Marvel Arena of Heroes" interactive telecast where select players (Curry, Andrew Wiggins, and Draymond Green for Golden State, Williamson, Lonzo Ball, and Brandon Ingram for New Orleans), gained or lost points based on stats, e.g. 1 point for each point scored, -1 point for every basket missed. The team that had the most Arena of Heroes points are named the champions of the broadcast. Ryan Ruocco and Richard Jefferson provided commentary in a heavily-Marvel themed studio in ESPN's Bristol campus, with Marvel expert Angélique Roché providing special commentary. Like the Daily Wager Megacast, this Megacast was available on ESPN+ and ESPN2.

NBA CourtView 
For the first time ever, ESPN presented one of their NBA broadcasts, completely in 3D technology. Debuting during the Mavericks-Nets game on Wednesday March 16th, and called by Drew Carter and Tim Legler, this broadcast was made available on ESPN+, as well as ESPNEWS, due to ESPN2’s coverage of the NIT.

NBA75 Celebration Game: Nets-Knicks 
Continuing the celebration of the NBA’s 75th anniversary, ESPN put together a special “RetroCast” of their Nets-Knicks NBA Wednesday broadcast. ESPN’s lead team of Mike Breen, Mark Jackson, Jeff Van Gundy, and Lisa Salters talked to a variety of special guests which included: Hall of Famers Oscar Robertson, Kareem Abdul-Jabbar, and Bill Walton, and legendary broadcasters Marv Albert, Bob Costas, Dick Stockton, and Hubie Brown, who was also working the main broadcast with Ryan Ruocco and Cassidy Hubbarth on ESPN. The broadcast also incorporated the style of graphics used in the 1960s, 1970s, 1980s, and 1990s, and special ABC Sports gold jackets were made and worn by the announcers. This broadcast aired on ESPN2.

NBA Finals: Celebrating 75: Celtics-Warriors Game 1 
Continuing the celebration of the NBA’s 75th anniversary, for the first time ever, ESPN put together a Megacast option for Game 1 the NBA Finals. This broadcast resembled the NBA75 Celebration Game in April. SportsCenter’s Michael Eaves, who also hosts NBA Countdown on Wednesdays, hosted this broadcast alongside New Orleans Pelicans guard CJ McCollum, who signed a deal to join ESPN in a multi-platform role, and Tim Legler. The trio provided their own commentary and talked with numerous special guests including Julius Erving and Magic Johnson. The broadcast also special graphics and footage from the NBA’s 75 year history. Due to ESPN holding commitments to the 2022 Women's College World Series, this broadcast aired on ESPN2, alongside the ABC broadcast.

NASCAR Busch Series Telcel-Motorola Mexico 200 
The fifth installment of ESPN Full Circle aired on March 4, 2007, a NASCAR Busch Series race held at Autodromo Hermanos Rodriguez in Mexico City. This was the first NASCAR race on Full Circle. ESPN's regular NASCAR announce team of Dr. Jerry Punch called the race along with analysis from Rusty Wallace and Andy Petree. Allen Bestwick, Mike Massaro, Jamie Little, and Dave Burns reported from pit lane.

Coverage 
 ESPN (ESPNHD) and ESPN Deportes featured a simulcast of the traditional race coverage in the Spanish language. This was the first event not covered in English by ESPN. During the race, viewers were asked to call 1-800-DEPORTES or log on to the network's website to express interest in adding it to their providers' channel lineups.
 ESPN2 (ESPN2HD) had the traditional race coverage in English.
 ESPN360 offered different camera views from the regular race.
 ESPNEWS provided updates through the event.

College football Megacasts

Florida State at Miami 
This was the third installment of ESPN Full Circle, which aired on September 4, 2006. The official name of this one was ESPN Full Circle: Florida State at Miami and the game was a college football matchup between the Florida State Seminoles at the Miami Hurricanes. ESPN's coverage of the game averaged 6,330,000 households (a 6.9 rating), making it the network's most-viewed college football game (including regular season and bowl games) ever. It was then the network's second highest-rated college football game (including regular season and bowl games) ever (behind a 7.7 rating for Florida State at Miami on ESPN October 8, 1994). The telecast was television's most-viewed program of the night across key male 18-to-34 (1,687,000 average), 18-to-49 (3,466,000) and 25-to-54 (3,453,000) demographics and fourth most-viewed program in households. Mike Patrick called the game along with analysis from Todd Blackledge and Holly Rowe reporting from the sideline.

Coverage 
 ESPN (ESPNHD) featured the traditional coverage of a not so regular football game. It also had "look-ins" to how other entities were covering the game
 ESPN2 (ESPN2HD) offered coverage of the game utilizing multiple camera angles in a mosaic-style presentation. The screen featured the primary ESPN telecast surrounded by seven additional camera angles that include isolations of the coaches, quarterbacks, running backs, receivers and other key offensive and defensive matchups. The screen at the bottom featured the SkyCam angle throughout the entire game.
 ESPNU televised the game from the SkyCam angle and feature the unique commentary and perspectives of ESPN Radio's Colin Cowherd. He reacted to the game and was joined by special guests.
 ESPN 360 offered a simulcast feed of ESPNU's SkyCam presentation with extra stats during commercial breaks.
 ESPN Deportes offered traditional game coverage with Spanish language commentary.
 Mobile ESPN targeted specifically to sports fans will provide a variety of content, including game alerts, live updates and in-game polling.
 ESPN International had a traditional telecast offered to approximately 54 countries worldwide.
 ESPN.com had a live chat with Jim Donnan, reports from Ivan Maisel, GameCast's real-time animated game representation and in-game polling.
 ESPNEWS offered frequent updates and analysis.
 ESPN Radio provided in-game updates from GameNight, on-site reports and periodic live audio of Colin Cowherd's commentary from ESPNU.

Florida vs. Auburn 
This was the fourth installment of ESPN Full Circle, which aired on October 14, 2006. The official name of this one was ESPN Full Circle delivered by The New AT&T: Florida vs. Auburn and the game was a college football matchup between the Florida Gators at the Auburn Tigers. It generated the lowest ratings of any of the Full Circle telecasts with a 3.3 rating. This was also the second college football game on Full Circle. Mike Patrick called the game along with analysis from Todd Blackledge and Holly Rowe reporting from the sideline.

Coverage 
 ESPN (ESPNHD) featured the traditional coverage of the college football game. It also had "look-ins" to how other entities were covering the game
 ESPN2 (ESPN2HD) featured the traditional game coverage surrounded by four other angles in smaller screens in a mosaic-style presentation that will isolate the head coaches, the quarterbacks as well as provide the full-time view from Skycam. ESPN Radio's Colin Cowherd provided commentary and react to the game and was joined by special guests including Chris Fowler, Lee Corso, Mark May, Lou Holtz and Mel Kiper Jr.
 ESPNU will feature the traditional game coverage on the main screen surrounded by five smaller screens, including isolation angles of the head coaches, the quarterbacks, and other storyline-driven views plus the full-time view from Skycam.
 ESPN 360 offered a simulcast feed of ESPNU's SkyCam presentation with extra stats during commercial breaks.
 Mobile ESPN televised live full game coverage streamed live on the phone, plus in-game alerts and highlights, as well as preview video clips and interviews.
 ESPN International had a traditional telecast offered to approximately 175 countries worldwide and at US Naval ships around the world.
 ESPN.com had a live chat with Pat Forde, reports from Ivan Maisel, GameCast's real-time animated game representation and in-game polling.
 ESPNEWS offered game highlights and opinions from ESPN's college football commentators, pre- and post-game analysis and live press conferences.
 ESPN Radio provided in-game updates from GameNight, on-site reports and periodic live audio of Colin Cowherd's commentary from ESPNU.
 College GameDay was broadcast live from the campus of Auburn University at the usual time of 10 a.m. ET and signed off at 12:01 PM.

BCS National Championship Game 
In December 2013, ESPN announced that it would cover the 2014 BCS National Championship Game with what it branded as a Megacast:

 ESPN carried traditional coverage of the game with Brent Musburger and Kirk Herbstreit, and ESPN Deportes broadcast the game in Spanish.
 ESPN2 aired BCS Title Talk, a broadcast of the game with special guests (such as celebrities and coaches) providing analysis
 ESPNU aired BCS Film Room, which featured expert analysis of plays hosted by Chris Spielman and Tom Luginbill
 ESPN Classic carried the game without commentary (Sounds of the BCS).
 ESPN Goal Line carried BCS Command Center, a split-screen view with live, on-screen statistics
 WatchESPN carried several online-exclusive feeds, including a Spidercam feed, and feeds featuring the Auburn Tigers and Florida State Seminoles radio broadcasts.

2014 Iron Bowl 
In November 2014, ESPN broadcast that season's edition of the Iron Bowl rivalry game between the Alabama Crimson Tide and Auburn Tigers. The game was accompanied by a special simulcast on SEC Network, the Finebaum Film Room, where Paul Finebaum, Cole Cubelic and Greg McElroy analyzed the game and took viewer calls.

2015 College Football Playoff National Championship 
The Megacast returned for the 2015 College Football Playoff National Championship;
 ESPN carried traditional coverage of the game with Chris Fowler and Kirk Herbstreit. The Film Room moved to ESPN2, ESPN Classic carried the commentary-free "sounds of the game" feed, and ESPN Goal Line again carried Command Center, a split-screen view with live, on-screen statistics and ESPN Radio audio.
 ESPNews carried Off The Ball, which carried person-on-person analysis of players not near the ball, hosted by Bob Wischusen
 ESPNU carried "Voices", which featured special guests providing analysis (similar to 2014's BCS Title Talk)
 WatchESPN carried several online-exclusive feeds, including the Spidercam, student sections, and team feeds with simulcasts of their respective radio networks.

2016 College Football Playoff 
For 2016, enhanced feeds were expanded to the College Football Playoff semi-final bowl games, the 2015 Orange Bowl and 2015 Cotton Bowl Classic. ESPN2 aired a simulcast of ESPN Deportes' Spanish-language coverage, and home and away radio broadcast feeds were carried on WatchESPN. Owing to the participation of Alabama, the Cotton Bowl broadcast additionally featured the return of the Finebaum Film Room on SEC Network, as previously featured during the 2014 Iron Bowl.

ESPN provided enhanced feeds during the 2016 College Football Playoff National Championship;
 As with the previous year, ESPN carried traditional coverage of the game, ESPN2 carried the Film Room with Brian Griese, Chris Spielman, and Jim McElwain, ESPN Deportes carried the game in Spanish, ESPN Classic carried a feed without commentary, and ESPN Goal Line carried the Command Center.
ESPNews carried ESPN Voices, with special guests discussing the game.
 ESPNU carried  the Homer Telecast, with Joe Tessitore on play-by-play and discussion of the game from the opposing viewpoints of Clemson alumni Tajh Boyd and Alabama alumni Barrett Jones.
 SEC Network carried the Finebaum Film Room, with Paul Finebaum, Greg McElroy, Booger McFarland, and Bret Bielema analyzing the game from the SEC perspective and taking viewer calls.
 WatchESPN carried several online-exclusive feeds, including the Spidercam, Pylon Cam (which feature feeds from cameras installed within the pylons at the sides of the field), team feeds with simulcasts of their respective radio networks and focus on star players, the Data Center with advanced statistics, and the Student Section cam. A new addition for 2016 was the Mock Replay Booth, which featured former ACC official Ralph Pickett, current SEC official Ben Oldham, and ESPN rules analyst Doug Rhoads providing an "inside look at the review process in which replay officials review every play of the game."

In Canada, the Film Room feed was carried by TSN2 (a sister network to the ESPN-affiliated TSN, which simulcast the ESPN broadcast across its main regional channels), while the TSN website carried ESPN Voices, Homer Telecast and Finebaum Film Room online. RDS carried a French language broadcast.

2017 College Football Playoff 
The Peach Bowl and Fiesta Bowl semi-final games were broadcast with Command Center on ESPN2, and Skycam, DataCenter (a simulcast of the main broadcast on ESPN with additional statistic displays), and simulcasts with audio from the participating teams' radio networks on WatchESPN. During the Peach Bowl, played between Alabama and Washington, SEC Network featured the Finebaum Film Room.

For the championship game, ESPN2 carried a reprise of the "homer" commentary featuring Joe Tessitore, Adam Amin, Tajh Boyd, and Barrett Jones, ESPN Voices (with Michelle Beadle, Keyshawn Johnson, Bill Walton, and Marcellus Wiley) aired on ESPNU, SEC Network carried the Finebaum Film Room, ESPNews carried the Coaches Film Room (hosted by Brian Griese, featuring discussion of the game with Dino Babers, Steve Addazio, Kalani Sitake, Dave Doeren, Mike MacIntrye, and Matt Rhule), and ESPN Goal Line carried Command Center. WatchESPN carried the Mock Replay Booth, DataCenter, as well as Skycam, Pylon Cam, Taco Bell Student Section, and simulcasts with audio from the participating teams' radio networks.

In Canada, the Homer Telecast, ESPN Voices, and the Coaches Film Room were available for streaming via TSN Go.

2017 Ohio State–Indiana game 
On August 15, 2017, ESPN announced it would utilize its Megacast production on its August 31 college football season opener featuring Ohio State at Indiana. ESPNews carried the "Coaches' Film Room" (with the on-air debut of Les Miles), ESPNU carried a "homer" broadcast with Dan Dakich, Adnan Virk, and Joe Tessitore, while ESPN Goal Line carried Command Center. ESPNU also carried Field Pass, a pre-game show hosted from inside Memorial Stadium. "DataCenter", all-22, and skycam views were available on the ESPN App.

2018 College Football Playoff and New Year's Six 
For the December 2017 Cotton Bowl Classic, ESPN carried the main game while the ESPN App offered All-22, Command Center and Skycam views. ESPN's other linear channels did not participate for that game because of college basketball commitments.

For the 2018 Outback Bowl, ESPN2 carried the main game while the ESPN App offered only the SkyCam view. ESPN was airing the 2018 Peach Bowl at the same time so therefore the Outback Bowl was moved to ESPN2.

For the semifinal games—the 2018 Rose Bowl and Sugar Bowl, ESPNews offered the Film Room (featuring Syracuse's Dino Barbers, North Carolina's Larry Fedora, West Virginia's Dana Holgorsen, Ole Miss' Matt Luke, TCU's Gary Patterson, and former Arkansas and Wisconsin coach Bret Bielema), as well as the Command Center (ESPN2), Finebaum Film Room (SEC Network), DataCenter (ESPN Goal Line) and other feeds on the ESPN App.

In addition to these feeds, the 2018 College Football Playoff National Championship added the "Homer Telecast" (ESPN2) with then New York Giants cornerback Landon Collins representing Alabama and former Georgia quarterback and current CBS Sports analyst Aaron Murray representing Georgia.

2018 Virginia Tech vs. Florida State 
For the September 3, 2018 (Labor Day) contest between Florida State and Virginia Tech), ESPN aired a six-channel megacast, with Coaches Film Room on ESPNEWS, Command Center on ESPNU, and Data Center and Skycam on ESPN3, in addition to the traditional telecast on ESPN. ESPN also planned to have a "BlimpCast" with Marty Smith and Ryan McGee calling the game from the world famous Goodyear Blimp. That was to be seen on the ESPN app. However, the "BlimpCast" was canceled at the last minute due to severe weather in the Tallahassee area. Instead, Marty and McGee did their own Megacast production from the sidelines, which was seen on the app.

2019 College Football Playoff Championship 
For the 2019 College Football Playoff National Championship, ESPN dramatically reorganized the Megacast offerings. On ESPN2, replacing the Homer Telecast was "Field Pass," where Adam Amin and Steve Levy covered the game from the sidelines with guests. ESPNews carried the "Monday Night Football Film Room", which featured analysis and discussion by the MNF commentary crew of Joe Tessitore, Jason Witten, and Booger McFarland, joined by Todd McShay. SEC Network carried a feed hosted by the panel of Thinking Out Loud (Marcus Spears, Greg McElroy and Alyssa Lang). ESPN Classic again carried the commentary-free Sounds of the Game (which included the halftime performances) while ESPNU carried Command Center.. ESPN3 offered hometown radio broadcasts, two different angles of skycam, an angle from the Goodyear Blimp, a wider all-22 angle, and a combined "TechCast" that shows multiple camera angles.

2020 College Football Playoff Championship 
New to the Megacast for 2020 was a "Refcast," which featured a panel of former officials to analyze calls made by the in-game officials, and views from mobile cameras worn by the officials and chain crew. SEC Network and ACC Network picked up the radio broadcasts for LSU and Clemson respectively. Command Center moved to ESPNEWS while ESPNU revived the Coaches Film Room. The main telecast, Field Pass, Sounds of the Game, all-22, DataCenter and a single skycam angle were carried over as they were in 2019, with the remaining feeds dropped.

2021 College Football Playoff 
For the 2021 Rose Bowl and Sugar Bowl semi-final games, ESPN offered the Command Center, SkyCast, Datacenter, all-22, and home radio feeds across its television networks and digital.

The national championship game featured most of the same options introduced for 2020, but with ESPN2 introducing the new "CFP Live" broadcast (hosted by the panel of ESPN's NFL Live), the Film Room moving to ESPNews, and the SkyCast moving to ESPNU. SEC Network took Alabama's radio feed, with Ohio State's radio broadcast, as well as the Command Center, Datacenter, Refcast, High SkyCam, and All-22 exclusive to streaming. A 4K SkyCam feed sponsored by Samsung was also offered via selected television providers. This was the last year that Sounds of the Game aired on ESPN Classic, as the channel is scheduled to shut down December 31, 2021.

2022 College Football Playoff 
In addition to the semifinals (the Cotton Bowl and the Orange Bowl), all New Year’s Six games (Peach Bowl, Fiesta Bowl, Rose Bowl, and Sugar Bowl), received the Megacast treatment. ESPN offered the Command Center, SkyCast, and All-22 for all games, with the home radio feeds, and halftime band performances for the semifinals.

The national championship game’s Megacast featured ESPN2 carrying the Film Room with Dusty Dvoracek joined by Texas A&M head coach Jimbo Fisher and his crew providing analysis, ESPNU carried Command Center, while SkyCast moved to ESPNEWS with Anish Shroff and Kelly Stouffer. Also part of the presentation is the Spanish-language telecast on ESPN Deportes and SEC Network carrying the local radio feed (Alabama in the first half and Georgia in the second half), with full coverage of Hometown Radio, as well as High Skycast, All-22 and halftime bands available digitally.

CFB Primetime with The Pat McAfee Show 
As part of his agreement to join ESPN for College GameDay, Pat McAfee was given the rights to his own Megacast coverage for select college football games. In another partnership with Omaha Productions, McAfee and his showmates, along with special guests, analyze the game while also partaking in fun activities and fan engagement throughout each broadcast. This Megacast airs on ESPN2, and concurrently airs during ESPN or ABC’s primetime game of the week.

2023 College Football Playoff 
Like last season, ESPN hosted Megacast coverage for all game surrounding the New Year’s Six. Among these broadcasts were two new Playoff Semifinal editions of “CFB Primetime with The Pat McAfee Show”, which served as the Field Pass broadcast on ESPN2 for both the VRBO Fiesta Bowl and the Chick-fil-A Peach Bowl. ESPN continued to offer the Command Center and AT&T 5G SkyCast for all games, with All-22, the home radio feeds, and new this year, a marching band camera feed for the semifinals. In addition, ESPNU simulcast the Command Center, while both SEC Network and ACC Network both simulcast the SkyCast for the Orange Bowl, with the former also simulcasting the Command Center for the Sugar Bowl.

The national championship game’s Megacast featured the return of “Field Pass with The Pat McAfee Show” on ESPN2, replacing the Film Room feed. ESPNU carried Command Center, while the AT&T 5G SkyCast aired on ESPNEWS. Comcast, DirecTV, YouTube TV, and Verizon subscribers got a separate SkyCam feed in 4K. Also part of the presentation was the Spanish-language telecast on ESPN Deportes and SEC Network carrying Georgia’s local radio feed. The All-22, TCU local radio, and marching band feeds were all available on the ESPN app.

NFL and Monday Night Megacasts

NFL Draft 
In response to a 2018 agreement in which Fox would simulcast NFL Network's coverage of the 2018 NFL Draft on broadcast agreement, ESPN, which has long held non-exclusive rights to the draft, announced it would expand its coverage for the 2018 draft to a multi-channel megacast.

ESPN and ESPN Deportes carried its usual draft coverage on opening night.
ESPN2 carried an alternate broadcast of the first night hosted by the College GameDay panel.
ABC aired the final day of the draft in simulcast with ESPN.

These arrangements were largely reprised for the 2019 draft, but with the College GameDay panel moving to ABC for its primetime coverage of the first two nights (which would feature an entertainment-oriented format). For the 2020 draft, due to the COVID-19 pandemic, ESPN's coverage was simulcast on NFL Network. The above arrangements returned for the 2021 NFL Draft, with NFL Network restoring their own coverage, and ESPN producing their telecast, and ABC's telecast.

Pro Bowl 
ESPN has carried the Pro Bowl since 2015. ABC later started simulcasting the game in 2018. For the 2019, 2020, and 2022 games, Disney XD was added to the simulcast. In contrast to college sports events, all of the simulcast partners for the Pro Bowl carry the same feed. The Disney XD simulcast in 2020 ended during the second quarter due to ABC and ESPN's continuing coverage of the death of NBA legend Kobe Bryant and his daughter Gianna. For 2021, ESPN, ABC, and Disney XD simulcast a special honoring the Pro Bowlers and their achievements during the 2020 season, as the COVID-19 pandemic canceled the game which was going to be held at Allegiant Stadium in Las Vegas, NV.

2020 Saints–Raiders game 
To celebrate the first NFL game in Las Vegas, and the 50th anniversary of Monday Night Football, ESPN held a Megacast the September 21 game between the New Orleans Saints and the Las Vegas Raiders. This was the first time that ESPN had ever Megacast an NFL regular-season game.
ESPN and ABC, who hadn't broadcast an NFL regular season game since 2005, both simulcast the game with the regular MNF team of Steve Levy, Brian Griese, Louis Riddick, Lisa Salters, and John Parry live from Las Vegas.
ESPN2 aired a special "watch party" telecast, hosted by Rece Davis from ESPN's main headquarters in Bristol, CT, and Kirk Herbstreit from his home in Nashville, TN. The College GameDay teammates  talked with various special guests, including Peyton Manning and Charles Barkley, throughout the game.
ESPN Deportes aired the game in Spanish.

2021 NFL Super Wild Card Weekend: Ravens vs. Titans 
Since 2015, ESPN owned rights to one NFL Wild Card game, which they simulcast on ABC and ESPN Deportes starting in 2016. On November 30, to go along with the announcement that ABC would simulcast two late-season MNF games (which both involved the Buffalo Bills), ESPN announced that the Megacast would return for the NFL Playoffs, with the game airing on ESPN, ABC, ESPN2, and ESPN Deportes (the same networks that were involved with the Week 2 Megacast), but this time, they included Disney-owned network Freeform, in an effort to attract a younger/female audience, similar to CBS' plan to simulcast their second Wild Card game on Nickelodeon, along with ESPN+. The announcement came after ESPN's Week 2 Megacast was deemed a success. This was the first NFL playoff game that ESPN2 will broadcast, and the first sports event to air on Freeform since the MLB Postseason in 2002. The Megacast went as follows:

ESPN and ABC simulcast the game with the regular MNF team of Steve Levy, Brian Griese, Louis Riddick, Lisa Salters, and John Parry live from Nashville.
ESPN2 aired the Film Room, with personalities from NFL Live and Sunday and Monday NFL Countdown providing their own commentary from ESPN's Seaport District Studios in New York City.
The Watch Party telecast returned, but this time, ESPN moved it to Freeform. The watch party this time was hosted by Jesse Palmer and Maria Taylor, who were live from Miami for the CFP National Championship Game the next day on ESPN. The duo talked with various special guests, including chef Duff Goldman, a huge Ravens fan, throughout the broadcast, which also featured a live halftime performance from DJ Khaled.
 ESPN+ broadcast Between the Lines, featuring the NFL Live and Daily Wager crews providing analytics, odds, and real-time analysis throughout the game. The NFL Live crew worked from Bristol awhile the Daily Wager crew worked from Las Vegas.
ESPN Deportes aired the game in Spanish.

All ESPN productions except Freeform were available on the ESPN app. The Freeform Watch Party was available on the NFL App.

Manningcast 

On July 19, 2021, ESPN announced a new 3-year partnership with Hall of Fame QB Peyton Manning and his production company Omaha Productions. This new deal will include the "ManningCast", a newly revamped version of the "Monday Night Megacast", which will feature Peyton and his younger brother Eli Manning, as well as celebrities and athletes. ESPN and Omaha Productions will produce 10 editions of this Megacast each season, which will begin in 2021, with the first three MNF games of the season. These telecasts will take place remotely, and will air on ESPN2, with a potential distribution across various Disney platforms and ESPN+. A multi-box viewing experience will always be shown, with the ESPN/ABC game feed being shown on one box, and Peyton and Eli's feed in another box.

Original plans had the Mannings being joined by a weekly guest host, but ultimately, ESPN decided to feature guests during each game in a less prominent capacity, instead letting the Mannings analyze the game themselves. Both will be live from Denver and New Jersey respectively, although the first week will be from the ESPN Seaport District Studios due to prior scheduling conflicts.

After a very successful first season, ESPN and Omaha Productions agreed to a one-year extension of the Manningcast, while also expanding Omaha Productions’ Megacast production rights to other sports like: college football, UFC events, and select golf tournaments.

2021 Ravens-Raiders game 
Nearly a year after their first ever NFL Megacast, ESPN held another Monday Night Megacast for the September 13 game between the Baltimore Ravens and the Raiders to celebrate the first NFL game at Allegiant Stadium with fans in attendance.

ESPN and ABC once again simulcast the game with the regular MNF team of Steve Levy, Brian Griese, Louis Riddick, Lisa Salters, and John Parry live from Las Vegas.
ESPN2 and ESPN+ aired the first edition of the "ManningCast", hosted by Peyton and Eli Manning, live from the ESPN Seaport District Studios in New York City. While analyzing the game, they both talked with various special guests throughout the game including Seattle Seahawks quarterback Russell Wilson.
ESPN+ also broadcast Between the Lines, which featured the NFL Live and Daily Wager crews providing analytics, odds, and real-time analysis throughout the game. The NFL Live crew worked from Bristol, while the Daily Wager crew worked from Las Vegas.
ESPN Deportes aired the game in Spanish.

All broadcasts were available to be streamed live on the ESPN App.

2022 Monday Night Super Wild Card Game: Cardinals vs. Rams 
The NFL Playoff Megacast returned for the 2022 playoffs. This year, with the NFL moving a game to Monday Night, ESPN signed a 5-year deal to not only air the Monday Night Wild Card Game, but also give it the Megacast treatment. The 2022 Megacast between the Cardinals and Rams went as follows:
 ESPN and ABC once again simulcast the game with the regular MNF team of Steve Levy, Brian Griese, Louis Riddick, Lisa Salters, and John Parry calling the game from Los Angeles.
ESPN2 and ESPN+ aired a special playoff edition of the "ManningCast", hosted by Peyton and Eli Manning, live from their homes.
 ESPN+ also broadcast Between the Lines, which once again featured the NFL Live and Daily Wager crews providing analytics, odds, and real-time analysis throughout the game. The NFL Live crew worked from Bristol, while the Daily Wager crew worked from Las Vegas.
ESPN Deportes aired the game in Spanish.

All broadcasts were available on the ESPN app, as well as ESPN+, and the NFL and Yahoo! platforms.

2022 Broncos-Seahawks game 
For the second consecutive year, the Megacast treatment was given for the Week 1 MNF game. This time, it featured the new look Denver Broncos, led by newly acquired quarterback Russell Wilson, facing his former team, the Seattle Seahawks. The 2022 Week 1 Megacast went as follows:
 ESPN and ABC once again simulcast the game with the regular MNF team of Joe Buck, Troy Aikman, Lisa Salters, and John Parry calling the game from Seattle. This was also Buck and Aikman’s first game as MNF announcers, after signing with ESPN in the offseason.
ESPN2 and ESPN+ aired the season premiere of the "ManningCast", hosted by Peyton and Eli Manning, live from their homes.
ESPN Deportes aired the game in Spanish.

All broadcasts were available on the ESPN app, as well as ESPN+, and NFL+.

2023 Monday Night Super Wild Card Game: Cowboys vs. Buccaneers 
Once again, ESPN and ABC aired a Monday Night Super Wild Card Game. This year’s Megacast between the Cowboys and Buccaneers went as follows:
 ESPN and ABC once again simulcast the game with the regular MNF team of Joe Buck, Troy Aikman, Lisa Salters, and John Parry calling the game from Tampa. This was also the first playoff game Buck and Aikman called for ESPN and ABC.
ESPN2 and ESPN+ aired a special playoff edition of the "ManningCast", hosted by Peyton and Eli Manning, live from their homes.
ESPN Deportes aired the game in Spanish.

All broadcasts were available on the ESPN app, as well as ESPN+, and NFL+.

Future NFL Megacasts 
To go along with ESPN's new deal with the NFL, the network can give some games the Megacast treatment, as the new deal will allow expanded rights for interactivity and alternate broadcasts. For example, these Megacasts can happen for the Super Bowl, which ABC will air.

ESPN FC Megacasts

2017 Copa del Rey Semifinals and Final 

From 2017 onwards, the enhanced Megacast feeds will be expanded to ESPN FC-branded broadcasts, starting with the Copa del Rey Semifinals and the Final.

MLB Megacasts

MLB StatCast
With Major League Baseball partnering with at first Amazon Web Services, later Google Cloud to provide "next-gen stats", similar to the NFL's Next-Gen Stats program, ESPN teams up with MLB to air a Statcast broadcast for select MLB telecasts including Sunday Night Baseball, the Major League Baseball Home Run Derby, and the Major League Baseball Wild Card Game. These telecasts usually air on ESPN2.

Future MegaCasts
With Major League Baseball and ESPN coming to agreements on a new deal, ESPN will now have the power to produce alternate broadcasts of select MLB games on different ESPN networks, along with ESPN+, which picked up the rights to simulcast ESPN broadcasts.

KayRod Cast
In 2022, ESPN debuted the “Kay-Rod Cast”, a MegaCast for Sunday Night Baseball with a similar approach to the “ManningCast”.  This MegaCast will feature Yankee broadcaster Michael Kay and former Yankee Alex Rodriguez, providing their own commentary, while also integrating fantasy baseball stats, analytical predictions, and special guests throughout the game. There will be eight presentations of this MegaCast, with both men appearing from ESPN’s Seaport District studios for select games, while appearing from home in other games.

NHL Megacasts 
On March 10, 2021, ESPN announced a seven-year agreement with the National Hockey League to serve as one of its two rightsholders; ESPN networks will hold rights to the Stanley Cup Finals for four out of the next seven seasons, which will be aired on ABC exclusively. ESPN stated that the agreement would include the ability to air Megacast coverage with alternate feeds, as well as simulcast the games on ESPN+.

Star Watch 
To coincide with the first meeting of the 2021-22 season between Sidney Crosby and Alex Ovechkin, on December 10, ESPN broke out the Megacast for the first time during the Penguins-Capitals matchup, with a “Star Watch” broadcast, featuring isolated cameras and individual stats on Crosby and Ovechkin. Both the game, and the Star Watch broadcast, were available on ESPN+, with the game also being simulcast on Hulu.

The Star Watch returned for the 2022-23 season with select games having this alternate broadcast throughout the season.

IceCast 
For the remainder of ABC’s NHL schedule for the 2021-22 season, ESPN broke the Megacast seal for those games. Beginning with the Rangers-Penguins matchup, ESPN produced a separate “IceCast”, which allowed fans to see how plays develop from above the ice. Unlike previous Megacasts where a different set of announcers call the action, ESPN takes the game feed from ABC and applies it to the IceCast. Like the Star Watch broadcast, back in December, these live broadcasts, along with the ABC telecast, were available on ESPN+.

The IceCast returned during ESPN’s coverage of the 2022 Eastern Conference Finals, and then for ABC’s coverage of the 2022 Stanley Cup Finals, marking the first ever alternate broadcast for a Stanley Cup Finals.

All-12 
In a similar approach to the “All-22” alternate broadcast shown during college football games, ESPN experimented with an “All-12” broadcast during the 2023 NHL Stadium Series game on February 18 between the Washington Capitals and the Carolina Hurricanes at Carter-Finley Stadium, home of the NC State Wolfpack, which is located directly next door to the Hurricanes’ home arena, PNC Arena. This broadcast, focusing on all 12 players featured on the ice during the game, was broadcast on ESPN+, along with the traditional ABC broadcast.

Puck Possessor 
In a similar approach to the FoxTrax glowing puck from the ‘90s, ESPN produced a “Puck Possessor” visual identifier altcast for select ABC games. This broadcast, that takes the main feed and focuses on who has the puck during games, is broadcast on ESPN+, along with the traditional ABC broadcast.

NHL Big City Greens Classic 
In a similar approach to Nickelodeon’s NFL broadcasts with the NFL and CBS Sports, ESPN will present a kid-friendly alternate animated broadcast of the March 14th game between the Washington Capitals and the New York Rangers, focused on the hit Disney Channel show Big City Greens. Dubbed the “NHL Big City Greens Classic”, this broadcast, which will animate every player on a rink in the middle of Big City, and will be called by ESPN personnel and Big City Greens cast members, will be simulcast across Disney Channel, Disney XD, Disney+, and ESPN+, along with the traditional ESPN broadcast, which will also feature the Star Watch broadcast. This will be the first ever live sports broadcast for both Disney Channel and Disney+, while this will be the first live sports broadcast, other than the Pro Bowl Games, to air on Disney XD.

7Innings Live 
Beginning with the 2021 Women's College World Series, ESPNU began airing an alternate broadcast of the Championship Series games with the 7Innings Live crew. This Megacast is unique because each game had a different theme, including a Disney-tourist themed broadcast.

Little League KidsCast 
For the 2019 Little League World Series, ESPN produced a special KidsCast version of select games, where kids selected from the Bruce Beck Sports Broadcasting Camp, will call the action, along with former pitcher Mo'ne Davis. One game aired on ESPN, while one aired on ESPN2. The KidsCast returned in 2021, this time for the 2021 MLB Little League Classic, and was used for a game on August 24 at 7:30 ET. The MLB-Little League KidsCast aired on ESPN2. The KidsCast for the MLB Little League Classic returned for 2022 as well.

Golf Megacasts

2022 PGA Championship
For their coverage of the 2022 PGA Championship, ESPN, along with Omaha Productions, as part of the one-year extension of their MNF deal, produced a Manningcast-type alternate broadcast. This broadcast was hosted by Joe Buck, the new voice of Monday Night Football, and ESPN golf analyst Michael Collins, the host of “America’s Caddie” on ESPN+. Buck made his official ESPN debut during these broadcasts, which aired during all four days of the PGA. 

Like the Manningcast, this broadcast featured a wide variety of special guests, including: Buck’s longtime broadcast partner and new MNF analyst Troy Aikman, Peyton and Eli Manning, Charles Barkley, ESPN NBA analyst Doris Burke, and Buffalo Bills quarterback Josh Allen, all providing commentary and conversation through live play.

Each broadcast aired for four hours each day. The first hour every day aired on ESPN, while the last three hours on Thursday and Friday shifted to ESPN2, and to ESPN+ on Saturday and Sunday.

References 

 Press Release:ESPN TO PRESENT FULL CIRCLE COVERAGE OF NBA PLAYOFF GAME APRIL 22
 Press Release:HAPPY BIRTHDAY TO "U" -- ESPNU TO CELEBRATE ONE-YEAR ANNIVERSARY MARCH 4 AS COMPANY UNVEILS FULL CIRCLE FRANCHISE
 Press Release:EVERY ESPN OUTLET TO COVER FLORIDA STATE VS. MIAMI SEPTEMBER 4
 Press Release: ESPN FULL CIRCLE PRESENTATION OF FLORIDA – AUBURN OCTOBER 14

2006 American television series debuts
2010s American television series
ESPN original programming
ESPN2 original programming
ESPNU original programming
American sports television series